Jiří Kotana is a retired Czechoslovak slalom canoeist who competed in the mid-to-late 1950s. He won four medals at the ICF Canoe Slalom World Championships with two golds (C-2 team: 1955, 1957) and two bronzes (C-2: 1955, 1957) .

References

Czech male canoeists
Czechoslovak male canoeists
Possibly living people
Year of birth missing (living people)
Medalists at the ICF Canoe Slalom World Championships